"Rock Bottom" is a song written by J.R. Cobb and Buddy Buie, and recorded by American country music artist Wynonna.  It was released in February 1994 as the fourth single from the album Tell Me Why.  The song reached #2 on the Billboard Hot Country Singles & Tracks chart.

Chart performance

Year-end charts

References 

1994 singles
Wynonna Judd songs
Song recordings produced by Tony Brown (record producer)
MCA Records singles
Curb Records singles
Songs written by Buddy Buie
1993 songs
Songs written by J. R. Cobb